Sterphus transversus is a species of Hoverfly in the family Syrphidae.

Distribution
Brazil.

References

Eristalinae
Insects described in 1857
Diptera of South America
Taxa named by Francis Walker (entomologist)